The Heart of Sister Ann is a 1915 British silent drama film directed by Harold M. Shaw and starring Edna Flugrath, Hayford Hobbs and Guy Newall. Its plot involves an orphaned dancer who repays the sister brought her up her by marrying the man she loves - after becoming pregnant by a Russian novelist.

This marked the film debut of Newall who went on to found one of the leading British silent-era film studios.

References

External links

1915 films
1915 drama films
British silent feature films
British drama films
British black-and-white films
1910s English-language films
1910s British films
Silent drama films